Rasmus Jönsson (born 27 January 1990) is a Swedish professional footballer who plays for Helsingborgs IF. He is normally deployed as a second striker.

Career

Helsingborgs IF 
He plays as a striker and got his breakthrough in 2008, scoring four goals in Allsvenskan alongside Henrik Larsson in Helsingborgs IF. Jönsson is commonly called "Sugröret", meaning the drinking straw, among his teammates. During the season 2010 in Allsvenskan, Helsingborgs IF Finished in second place just two points short of Malmö FF. Helsingborg however didn't allow this to let them down after a good season and finished it off on a high winning the Svenska Cupen in a final against Hammarby IF with Rasmus scoring the only goal in the game late on. On 29 August 2011, Helsingborgs IF confirmed that a deal had been agreed for Jönsson to join Bundesliga side VfL Wolfsburg on a four-year deal. Jönsson said that he was sad to leave Helsingborg but happy to take an important step forward in his career.

VfL Wolfsburg 
On 11 September 2011, Rasmus Jönsson made his Bundesliga debut from start against Schalke 04 and he assisted for Mario Mandžukić's second goal. Jönsson played 90 minutes before being substituted.

Loan to FSV Frankfurt 
On 29 January 2013, it was announced that Jönsson would join FSV Frankfurt on loan for the rest of the season.

AaB 
On 9 August 2013, it was announced that Jönsson would join the Danish Superliga club AaB on a loan spell for the 2013/2014 season. On Sunday 6 October he scored twice against Viborg. On 21 July 2014, it was announced that Jönsson joined AaB on a permanent two-year basis. Jönsson got shirt number 10.

OB 
In the Summer of 2016, Jönsson signed with the Danish club OB. In OB he was reunited with head coach Kent Nielsen. Nielsen was head coach in AaB when Jönsson joined the club before the 2013-14 season.

Buriram United 
On 2 July 2019 it was announced he had signed a deal with Buriram United in Thai League 1 until 30 November 2022. On the same day he traveled with his new teammates to their away fixture against JL Chiangmai United F.C. in the Thai League Cup. His team won 2–1 and Jönsson provided an assist.

Honours 
Helsingborgs IF
 Svenska Cupen: 2010

AaB
 Danish Superliga: 2013–14
 Danish Cup: 2013–14

References

External links
 
 

1990 births
Living people
Association football forwards
Swedish footballers
Sweden youth international footballers
Sweden under-21 international footballers
Sweden international footballers
Footballers from Skåne County
Helsingborgs IF players
VfL Wolfsburg players
FSV Frankfurt players
Bundesliga players
2. Bundesliga players
Expatriate footballers in Germany
Allsvenskan players
Superettan players
AaB Fodbold players
Danish Superliga players